Biagio Caropipe (died 1524) was a Roman Catholic prelate who served as Bishop of Telese o Cerreto Sannita (1515–1524).

Biography
On 1 June 1515, Biagio Caropipe was appointed Bishop of Telese o Cerreto Sannita by Pope Leo X.

He served as Bishop of Telese o Cerreto Sannita until his death on 10 July 1524.

References

External links and additional sources
 (Chronology of Bishops) 
 (Chronology of Bishops) 

16th-century Italian Roman Catholic bishops
Bishops appointed by Pope Leo X
1524 deaths